Sáenz is a station Under construction and the future terminus of Line H of the Buenos Aires Underground. Once complete, the station will connect with the Belgrano Sur commuter rail line and the Metrobus Sur BRT line in a new facility designed for the connection of the three lines.

Construction began in 2012, along with Facultad de Derecho, Las Heras, Santa Fe and Córdoba stations, however it was decided to prioritise the northern extension and Sáenz will open in the 2020s instead of with the other stations in 2015.

References

Buenos Aires Underground stations